Tommaso Russo (born 31 August 1971) is an Italian former boxer. He competed in the men's middleweight event at the 1992 Summer Olympics.

References

External links
 

1971 births
Living people
Italian male boxers
Olympic boxers of Italy
Boxers at the 1992 Summer Olympics
People from Marcianise
AIBA World Boxing Championships medalists
Middleweight boxers
Sportspeople from the Province of Caserta